Gustav Roller (19 February 1895 – 20 October 1959) was a German footballer who played as a defender and made one appearance for the Germany national team.

Career
Roller earned his first and only cap for Germany on 21 September 1924 in a friendly against Hungary. The away match, which was played in Budapest, finished as a 1–4 loss.

Personal life
Roller died on 20 October 1959 at the age of 64.

Career statistics

International

References

External links
 
 
 
 
 

1895 births
1959 deaths
Sportspeople from Pforzheim
Footballers from Baden-Württemberg
German footballers
Germany international footballers
Association football defenders
VfR Pforzheim players
1. FC Pforzheim players
20th-century German people